Jean Giubbini (19 November 1926 – 1 March 1979) was a Swiss field hockey player. He competed in the men's tournament at the 1960 Summer Olympics.

References

External links
 

1926 births
1979 deaths
Swiss male field hockey players
Olympic field hockey players of Switzerland
Field hockey players at the 1960 Summer Olympics
Sportspeople from Milan